Matthias Helferich (born 14 October 1988) is a German politician for the Alternative for Germany, and a faction-less member of the Bundestag since 2021.

Life and politics 

Helferich is born 1988 in the West German city of Dortmund, and was elected to the Bundestag in 2021.

References 

Living people
1988 births
Members of the Bundestag 2021–2025
21st-century German politicians
Politicians from Dortmund